HAWK is the 2nd studio album by American rapper Big Hawk from Houston, Texas. It was released on February 27, 2001 through Game Face and Ghetto Dreams.

Track listing

Personnel

John Edward Hawkins – main artist
Darius Coleman – featured artist (tracks: 5, 8, 12)
Oreoluwa Mitchell Magnus-Lawson – featured artist (tracks: 2, 13)
Poppy – featured artist (tracks: 9, 12)
Small Boy – featured artist (tracks: 10, 16)
Joseph Wayne McVey IV – featured artist (track 2)
J. "Jim Deezy" Babineaux – featured artist (track 5)
A. Morgan – featured artist (track 6)
Milton Powell – featured artist (track 8)
Chris Ward – featured artist (track 9)
Kyle Riley – featured artist (track 9)
Starchy Arch – featured artist (track 12)
Tiny T – featured artist (track 13)
Frazier Othel Thompson III – featured artist (track 14)
Carl Jones – featured artist (track 15)
Willy Malone – producer (tracks: 2, 5, 15-16), mixing, recording (tracks: 1-3, 5-6, 9-10, 13-16), executive producer
Shadow Black – producer (tracks: 1, 3, 14)
Todd E. Berry – producer (tracks: 8, 12), mixing, recording (tracks: 8, 11-12)
Quincy Whetstone – producer (track 4)
Teno – producer (track 6)
Spectacular – producer (track 7)
D.E.L. – producer (track 9)
Bruce Katara – producer (track 10)
André Sargent – producer (track 11)
Mike "MJ" Johnson – recording & producer (track 13)
James Hoover – mixing
Sean Blaze – recording (track 4)
Dietrich Pinnock – recording (track 7)
John Moran – mastering
Robert Louis – executive producer
Mike Frost – artwork
Chad Porter – photography

Chart positions

References

External links

2001 albums
Big Hawk albums